Adubato is a surname. Notable people with the surname include:

Michael F. Adubato (1934–1993), member of the New Jersey General Assembly
Richie Adubato (born 1937), American basketball coach
Steve Adubato Sr. (1932–2020), American educator and local politician
Steve Adubato Jr. (born 1957), American writer, journalist, motivational speaker and politician